Zeiraphera subcorticana is a species of moth of the family Tortricidae. It is found in China (Jilin, Heilongjiang, Guizhou), Japan and Russia.

The wingspan is 15–17 mm.

The larvae feed on Acer species.

References

Moths described in 1883
Eucosmini